Rainbow Falls is a waterfall in Western North Carolina, located near Brevard.  The falls is located on the Horsepasture River. It is on Pisgah National Forest land just outside Gorges State Park.

History
A proposal to route the flow of the river around the falls in the mid 1980s for a hydroelectric power plant was thwarted by public opposition. On October 27, 1986, the Horsepasture River was designated a national Wild and Scenic River, protecting the falls from future development.

Geology
The rock face over which the river flows is not vertical, but the large volume of water during normal river flows cause it to leap many feet out from the rock and a deep plunge pool lies at the bottom of the falls.  It creates large amounts of wind and mist that race up the hillside opposite the falls.  If the sun is in the right position, a rainbow is easily observed here, giving the falls its name.

Nearby Falls
Little Falls - located on private property upstream from Drift Falls
Narrows Falls - located in a gated community upstream from Drift Falls
Rock House Falls - 55-ft falls located on private property on Burlingame Creek, a tributary of the Horsepasture River
Turtleback Falls
Drift Falls
Stairway Falls
Sidepocket Falls
Windy Falls

External links
Rainbow falls on NCWaterfalls.com

Protected areas of Transylvania County, North Carolina
Waterfalls of North Carolina
Nantahala National Forest
Waterfalls of Transylvania County, North Carolina